The 1895–96 Welsh Cup was a knock-out football competition contested by teams from Wales. Bangor City F.C. defeated Wrexham F.C. in the final by a score of 3–1.

First round

Division One

Source: Welsh Football Data Archive

Division two

Source: Welsh Football Data Archive

 Ironbridge dismissed for fielding un-registered players

Replay

Source: Welsh Football Data Archive

Division Three

Source: Welsh Football Data Archive

Aberystwyth Town receive a bye to the next round
Whitchurch receive a bye to the next round
Porthmadoc receive a bye to the next round

Division Four

Source: Welsh Football Data Archive

Cardiff City scratch to Aberdare

Second round

Source: Welsh Football Data Archive

Porthmadoc scratch to Oswestry United
Rhayader scratch to Hereford
Bangor receive a bye to the next round
Aberdare receive a bye to the next round

Third round

Source: Welsh Football Data Archive

Replay

Source: Welsh Football Data Archive

Fourth round

Source: Welsh Football Data Archive

Replay

Source: Welsh Football Data Archive

Semi-final

Source: Welsh Football Data Archive

Replay

Source: Welsh Football Data Archive

.

Final

References

 Welsh Football Data Archive

 
Welsh Cup seasons
Welsh Cup